Castex is a gascon surname meaning "castle". Notable people with the surname include:

Françoise Castex, French Socialist MP
Jean Castex (born 1965), French politician, Prime Minister of France since 3 July 2020
Pierre Castex (1924–1991), French scriptwriter
Pierre-Georges Castex (1915–1995), literary critic
Raoul Castex, French Navy Vice Admiral (1878–1968), theorist of naval warfare

French-language surnames